Self Control is an animated short film in the Donald Duck series, produced in Technicolor by Walt Disney Productions and released to theaters on February 11, 1938, by RKO Radio Pictures. The film follows Donald trying to learn to control his temper by following the advice of a radio program.

It was directed by Jack King and features the voice of Clarence Nash as Donald Duck and Florence Gill as the clucking voice of a chicken. The voice of Uncle Smiley was uncredited.

Plot
Donald Duck is enjoying a leisurely day in his hammock sipping lemonade and listening to his radio. Soon Uncle Smiley's radio program comes on. Smiley is described as a "musical philosopher" and uses songs to maintain a positive attitude. Donald insists that he has never lost his temper.

However Donald's temper is soon put to the test first by a fly that lands on his foot, followed by a caterpillar which crawls down the underside of his hammock and tickles him. A chicken comes along and pecks Donald's rear end while trying to grab the caterpillar. Finally Donald antagonizes with a woodpecker for bathing in his bowl of lemonade, who retaliates by causing a huge amount of apples to fall onto the hammock tearing it up before pecking Donald's hat into a riddled rag.

At the end of the film Donald loses his temper and smashes the radio with a shotgun.

Voice cast
 Donald Duck: Clarence Nash
 Hen: Florence Gill

Home media
The short was released on May 18, 2004, on Walt Disney Treasures: The Chronological Donald, Volume One: 1934-1941.

References

External links
 
 

1930s color films
Donald Duck short films
1938 animated films
1938 short films
1930s Disney animated short films
Films directed by Jack King
Films produced by Walt Disney
Films scored by Oliver Wallace
Films with screenplays by Carl Barks
American animated short films
1930s English-language films
Films about ducks
RKO Pictures short films
RKO Pictures animated short films
1930s American films